The 2003 Internazionali Femminili di Palermo was a women's tennis tournament played on outdoor clay courts in Palermo, Italy that was part of the Tier V category of the 2003 WTA Tour. It was the 16th edition of the Internazionali Femminili di Palermo and took place from 7 July until 13 July 2003. Ninth-seeded Dinara Safina won the singles title and earned $16,000 first-prize money.

Finals

Singles
 Dinara Safina defeated  Katarina Srebotnik, 6–3, 6–4
 It was Safina's 1st singles title of the year and the 2nd of her career.

Doubles
 Adriana Serra Zanetti /  Emily Stellato defeated  María José Martínez Sánchez /  Arantxa Parra Santonja, 6–4, 6–2

References

External sources
 ITF tournament edition details
 Tournament draws

Torneo Internazionali Femminili di Palermo
Torneo Internazionali Femminili di Palermo
Internazionali Femminili di Palermo
Torneo